Permutotetraviridae is a family of viruses. Lepidopteran insects serve as natural hosts. The family contains one genus that has two species. Diseases associated with this family include: infection outcome varies from unapparent to lethal.

Taxonomy
Permutotetraviridae has one genus which contains two species:
 Genus: Alphapermutotetravirus
 Euprosterna elaeasa virus
 Thosea asigna virus

Structure
Viruses in Permutotetraviridae are non-enveloped, with icosahedral geometries, and T=4 symmetry. The diameter is around 40 nm. Genomes are linear, around 5.6kb in length.

Life cycle
Viral replication is cytoplasmic. Entry into the host cell is achieved by penetration into the host cell. Replication follows the positive stranded RNA virus replication model. Positive stranded RNA virus transcription is the method of transcription. Lepidopteran insectes serve as the natural host. Transmission routes are oral.

References

External links
 Viralzone: Permutotetraviridae
 ICTV

 
Virus families
Riboviria